The 2020 VMI Keydets football team represented the Virginia Military Institute in the 2020–21 NCAA Division I FCS football season. It was VMI's 130th football season. The Keydets were led by sixth-year head coach Scott Wachenheim. They played their home games at 10,000–seat Alumni Memorial Field at Foster Stadium. They are a member of the Southern Conference (SoCon).

On April 17, 2021, VMI defeated The Citadel 31–17 in the Military Classic of the South, retaining the Silver Shako, and winning their first Southern Conference Football Championship since 1977. Upon winning the Southern Conference title, the Keydets were awarded the conference's automatic bid to the FCS Playoffs, VMI's first appearance. The Keydets lost in the First Round at James Madison, 31–24.

Previous season

The Keydets finished the 2019 season 5–7, 4–4 in SoCon play to finish in a three-way tie for fourth place.

Schedule
VMI had a game scheduled against Princeton, which was canceled before the start of the 2020 season.

References

VMI
VMI Keydets football seasons
Southern Conference football champion seasons
VMI
VMI Keydets football